KOSA-TV (channel 7) is a television station licensed to Odessa, Texas, United States, serving as the CBS affiliate for the Permian Basin area. It is owned by Gray Television alongside MyNetworkTV affiliate KWWT (channel 30, also licensed to Odessa), Big Spring–licensed CW+ affiliate KCWO-TV (channel 4), Telemundo affiliate KTLE-LD (channel 7.5) and Antenna TV affiliate KMDF-LD (channel 22). The stations share studios inside the Music City Mall on East 42nd Street in Odessa, with a secondary studio and news bureau in downtown Midland; KOSA-TV's transmitter is located on FM 866 west of Odessa. The station is relayed on low-power translator  in Big Spring.

History
KOSA-TV signed on the air on January 1, 1956, and has been a CBS affiliate since its debut. Licensed to the corporate entity Odessa Television Co., the station was part of the Trigg-Vaughn Stations group, owned and operated by Cecil L. Trigg and Jack Vaughn. KOSA-TV originally operated from studios located on North Whitaker Street in Odessa. KOSA-TV is the only Big Three station in the Permian Basin to have never changed affiliation. In 1967, Trigg-Vaughn sold both KOSA-TV and KDBC-TV in El Paso, Texas, to Doubleday Broadcasting, a subsidiary of book publisher Doubleday and Company.

From 1956 to 1964, the first KOSA-TV sports anchor was Jim Reese, who was elected mayor of Odessa in 1968 and served until 1974. Doubleday sold the station to Forward Communications in 1973. Reese is now the owner of Penatek Industries of Odessa and has been involved in Republican political activities, particularly between 1964 and 1982.

On November 26, 1983, a chartered twin-engine Beechcraft B100 King Air turboprop was flying from Fort Worth back to Odessa when it fell nose first, crashed and burned on impact. It killed all eight on board, instantly, some burned beyond recognition. Six of the victims were KOSA-TV station employees who had been away filming high school football playoffs. The plane burned for about four hours before firemen could extinguish the blaze. A charred and twisted heap of metal was all that remained.

The victims were eventually identified as assistant news director Gary Hopper, 32, of Midland; sports director Jeff Shull, 25, of Odessa; chief engineer Bobby Stephens, 47, of Odessa; assistant chief engineer Edward Monette, 26, of Odessa; production assistants Bruce Dyer, 26, of Midland and Brent Roach, 24, of Odessa; pilot Keith Elkin, 29, of Midland; and Jay Alva Price, 37, of Midland, a helper for the station at football games and Hopper's brother-in-law.

Local real estate company Investment Corporation of America (ICA) purchased the station from Benedek Broadcasting in 2000. On May 20, 2015, Gray Television announced that it would acquire KOSA-TV from ICA for $33.6 million; the sale was completed on July 1. The deal reunited KOSA-TV with several of its former Benedek sister stations, as Gray acquired most of Benedek's stations following the latter's bankruptcy in 2002.

By fall 2017, the over-the-air digital signal of KOSA-DT2 had been upgraded into 720p 16:9 high definition, thus giving viewers in the Odessa–Midland market over-the-air access to MyNetworkTV's high definition feed for the first time.

On June 25, 2018, Gray announced it had reached an agreement with Montgomery, Alabama-based Raycom Media to merge their respective broadcasting assets (consisting of Raycom's 63 existing owned-and/or-operated television stations, including competing NBC affiliate KWES-TV (channel 9) and its satellite KWAB-TV (channel 4), and Gray's 93 television stations) under Gray's corporate umbrella. The cash-and-stock merger transaction valued at $3.6 billion—in which Gray shareholders would acquire preferred stock currently held by Raycom—required divestment of either KOSA-TV or KWES-TV due to FCC ownership regulations prohibiting common ownership of two of the four highest-rated stations in a single market (as well as more than two stations in any market). Gray announced it would retain KOSA-TV, and sell KWES-TV to an unrelated third party. On August 20, it was announced that Tegna Inc. would buy KWES and sister station WTOL in Toledo, Ohio for $105 million. However, Gray retained KWAB and converted it to a CW+ affiliate under the callsign KCWO, with a simulcast on KOSA's second digital subchannel. The sale was completed on January 2, 2019.

On July 24, 2020, it was announced that Gray would purchase MeTV affiliate KWWT, and sister low-power station, KMDF-LD for $1.84 million, pending FCC approval. Gray sought a failing station waiver as the Odessa–Midland market would not have at least eight independent voices after the transaction (KCWO-TV is licensed as a satellite of KOSA-TV despite airing different programming). In addition, Gray also announced that after the sale, KWWT would move its operations to the shared KOSA/KCWO facility in Odessa. The FCC granted the waiver on September 14. The sale was completed on September 30.

Making News: Texas Style

KOSA-TV was the setting for a TV Guide Network reality series called Making News: Texas Style, which revolved around the inner workings, staff, and personalities of the station's news department. The show aired Mondays from June 11, 2007 to September 23, 2007.

Sports programming
KOSA-TV became an affiliate for Big 12 Network basketball in 2008. That same year they entered into a contract with KTXA in Dallas–Fort Worth to carry select Dallas Mavericks basketball games. The Mavericks games aired in Odessa–Midland on MyTV 16 in 2008–2009 and 2010–2011. In 2009, KOSA-TV entered into a contract to air the locally televised Texas Rangers baseball games. The games took place on various nights in 2009 as they were programmed by KDFI. From 2010 to the present the Rangers games aired on Friday nights as part of the Friday Night Baseball on TXA 21 package. In 2012, KOSA-TV entered into a contract to air SEC Network football games. In all these cases, the sports contracts placed the games on MyTV 16 (now MyTV 30) as CBS prime time and sports programming usually airs during this time on KOSA. All these contracts expired. However, in 2016, KOSA-TV became the television home of UTPB Falcons football. All home games have aired Tuesday nights via tape delay on MyTV.

Technical information

Subchannels
The station's digital signal is multiplexed:

Analog-to-digital conversion
KOSA-TV shut down its analog signal, over VHF channel 7, on June 12, 2009, the official date in which full-power television stations in the United States transitioned from analog to digital broadcasts under federal mandate. The station's digital signal relocated from its pre-transition UHF channel 31 to VHF channel 7 for post-transition operations.

See also
Channel 7 digital TV stations in the United States
Channel 7 virtual TV stations in the United States
Channel 16 branded TV stations in the United States

References

External links

KOSA-TV Collection at the Texas Archive of the Moving Image

CBS network affiliates
Heroes & Icons affiliates
OSA-TV
Television channels and stations established in 1956
1956 establishments in Texas
Gray Television